The Tournoi Indoor de Paris-Bercy was a mid-season indoor football invitational competition hosted by French club Paris Saint-Germain at AccorHotels Arena in Paris, France. The tournament was founded in 1984 and was held annually until 1991. Played indoors (synthetic field and seven-a-side), the competition featured host club PSG and five more teams.

1983 European champions Hamburger SV won the inaugural 1984 edition, which also featured hosts Paris SG, French clubs Monaco and Bordeaux, Brazilian team Fluminense and Algerian side Tizi Ouzou (currently named JS Kabylie). Ukrainian club Dynamo Kyiv, for its part, won the tournament's last edition in 1991.

Paris SG is the most successful club in the history of the competition, having lifted the trophy on two occasions. The Parisians are the only club to have won the tournament more than once. Besides Hamburger SV and Dynamo Kyiv, German side Köln, Belgian outfit Anderlecht, Brazilian team Santos and Dutch club Ajax also won the competition once.

History

Hosts Paris Saint-Germain finally won its first Tournoi Indoor de Paris-Bercy in 1987, in what was the competition's fourth edition. Despite losing their opening day game against Porto (2–3), the Red and Blues qualified to the winners group after beating Bordeaux (5–2) in matchday two, thanks to a brace from Jules Bocandé. Squared against Marseille and Porto in the winners group, a first success against OM (5–3, Bocandé hat-trick) put PSG on the right track before meeting the Portuguese side in the tournament final. With Safet Sušić at the top of his game, Paris won 6–2 with goals from Bocandé (2), Claude Lowitz (2), Dominique Rocheteau and an own goal from Porto's Barbosa; and, unsurprisingly, Sušić was named player of the tournament.

Sušić was again impressive for Paris in 1989, setting the tournament record for most goals scored in a single edition, with eleven. His team's overall performance, however, was disappointing. The Parisians lost both their games in the first phase — against Red Star Belgrade (4–6) and eventual champions Ajax (4–8) — and finished the tournament in fourth place.

A year later, in 1990, Paris won the trophy for the second time. Having already qualified to the final phase after thrashing Partizan (8–0), PSG clashed with Malmö in matchday two of the first phase. The Swedish side was largely superior, winning the game 5–2, despite the goals from Daniel Bravo and David Rinçon for PSG. Both teams would meet again in the final of the tournament, where the Parisians would get their revenge. A close match, PSG managed to win 4–3 with goals from Pascal Nouma (2), Safet Sušić and Rinçon; repeating the feat of 1987.

Like in 1988, defending title holders PSG couldn't keep the trophy in 1991, which would prove to be the last edition of the Paris-Bercy indoor tournament. With no hope of being champions after a disastrous first phase, Paris met Benfica in the ranking group (places 4–6) for the fourth place match. Despite goals from Jocelyn Angloma, Francis Llacer (2) and David Rinçon, the French capital side finished off a frustrating campaign as it had started, losing 4–7 to Benfica to finish in fifth place.

Rules

The tournament was played at the AccorHotels Arena synthetic indoor sports arena during two evenings. It consisted of two phases. In the First Phase, competing teams were divided into two groups of three teams (Group A and Group B). In the Second Phase, the winners of each group and the best third-ranked side progressed to the Winners Group (places 1–3), while the remaining three teams went to the Ranking Group (places 4–6). Two points for a win, one point for a draw.

A match consisted of two halves of 14 minutes each. There was a 2-minute half-time break between halves. Each team consisted of a maximum of seven players (excluding substitutes), one of whom had to be the goalkeeper. The number of substitutions permitted were unlimited. A game was officiated by a referee. The referee was assisted by one assistant referee. A yellow card led to a temporary exclusion of 2 minutes, while a red card required the player to leave the field of play immediately, forcing the team to play a man fewer. It also resulted in the suspension of the offending player for the next match.

The offside rule did not apply. A shot on goal could only be made from the opposing side. Indoor football courts are delimited by walls instead of lines, and there are no player throw-ins. Therefore, players were allowed to play with the walls. If the ball flew over the walls or contacted the ceiling, play was stopped and the team opposing the one that most recently touched the ball was awarded a free kick at the location where the ball left the arena or made contact with the ceiling. In case of a foul in the penalty area, the shot is taken from the penalty mark, which is 9 meters from the goal line. Goals are also smaller than in standard football and the penalty area is also smaller. The field is commonly 61m by 26m.

Tiebreakers
The ranking of teams in the groups were determined as follows:

 Points obtained in all group matches;
 Goal difference in all group matches;
 Number of goals scored in all group matches.

Records and statistics

Finals

Performances by club

References

External links

Official websites
PSG.FR - Site officiel du Paris Saint-Germain
Paris Saint-Germain - Ligue 1
Paris Saint-Germain - UEFA.com

Paris Saint-Germain F.C.
Defunct international club association football competitions in Europe
Indoor soccer competitions
French football friendly trophies
International club association football competitions hosted by Paris
1984 establishments in France
Recurring sporting events established in 1984